Elections to Coleraine Borough Council were held on 21 May 1997 on the same day as the other Northern Irish local government elections. The election used four district electoral areas to elect a total of 22 councillors.

Election results

Note: "Votes" are the first preference votes.

Districts summary

|- class="unsortable" align="centre"
!rowspan=2 align="left"|Ward
! % 
!Cllrs
! % 
!Cllrs
! %
!Cllrs
! %
!Cllrs
! % 
!Cllrs
!rowspan=2|TotalCllrs
|- class="unsortable" align="center"
!colspan=2 bgcolor="" | UUP
!colspan=2 bgcolor="" | DUP
!colspan=2 bgcolor="" | SDLP
!colspan=2 bgcolor="" | Alliance
!colspan=2 bgcolor="white"| Others
|-
|align="left"|Bann
|bgcolor="40BFF5"|47.2
|bgcolor="40BFF5"|3
|19.4
|1
|30.9
|2
|2.5
|0
|0.0
|0
|6
|-
|align="left"|Coleraine Central
|bgcolor="40BFF5"|49.9
|bgcolor="40BFF5"|3
|24.2
|1
|14.5
|1
|10.2
|1
|1.2
|0
|6
|-
|align="left"|Coleraine East
|32.6
|2
|bgcolor="#D46A4C"|37.7
|bgcolor="#D46A4C"|2
|0.0
|0
|12.0
|1
|17.7
|0
|5
|-
|align="left"|The Skerries
|bgcolor="40BFF5"|39.3
|bgcolor="40BFF5"|2
|16.0
|1
|11.0
|0
|14.9
|1
|18.8
|1
|5
|-
|- class="unsortable" class="sortbottom" style="background:#C9C9C9"
|align="left"| Total
|43.4
|10
|23.2
|5
|16.3
|3
|9.2
|3
|7.9
|1
|22
|-
|}

District results

Bann

1993: 3 x UUP, 2 x SDLP, 1 x DUP
1997: 3 x UUP, 2 x SDLP, 1 x DUP
1993-1997 Change: No change

Coleraine Central

1993: 3 x UUP, 1 x DUP, 1 x SDLP, 1 x Alliance
1997: 3 x UUP, 1 x DUP, 1 x SDLP, 1 x Alliance
1993-1997 Change: No change

Coleraine East

1993: 3 x UUP, 2 x DUP
1997: 2 x UUP, 2 x DUP, 1 x Alliance
1993-1997 Change: Alliance gain from UUP

The Skerries

1993: 3 x UUP, 1 x DUP, 1 x Alliance
1997: 2 x UUP, 1 x DUP, 1 x Alliance, 1 x Independent
1993-1997 Change: Independent gain from UUP

References

Coleraine Borough Council elections
Coleraine